Thomas Curley (born July 6, 1948) is an American businessman and journalist who served as President of the Associated Press, the world's largest news organization. He retired in 2012.

Early life and education
Curley was born in Easton, Pennsylvania. At age 15, he started writing for The Express-Times. 

He earned a Bachelor of Arts degree in political science from La Salle University, where he served as editor in chief of the student newspaper, The Collegian, and was a member of Sigma Phi Lambda fraternity. He earned an MBA from Rochester Institute of Technology. In 1994, Curley received an Honorary Doctorate from his undergraduate alma mater.

Career 
In 1972, he worked as an editor for the Rochester Times-Union. He became director of information for Gannett Company, Inc. in 1976. In 1979, he was one of the original news staffers that founded USA Today. In 1982, he became the editor of The Bulletin, and in 1983, publisher of The Courier-News.  He served as the president and publisher of USA Today from 1991 to 2003. In 1998, he became senior vice president of Gannett. Curley served as the President of the Associated Press from June 2003 until 2012.

He is a trustee of the Ronald McDonald House Charities. He also serves on the executive board of the Ad Council, and he is the former chairman of the American Advertising Federation's Advertising Hall of Fame.

References

External links

1948 births
Living people
American newspaper publishers (people)
American male journalists
Writers from Easton, Pennsylvania
Easton Area High School alumni
La Salle University alumni
Rochester Institute of Technology alumni
Associated Press people
Journalists from Pennsylvania